KOIR is a Spanish language Christian radio station licensed to Edinburg, Texas, broadcasting on 88.5 MHz FM. KOIR serves the areas of McAllen, Texas, United States, and Reynosa, Tamaulipas in Mexico.  KOIR's programming is also heard on AM 910 KRIO (AM) in McAllen, Texas and 97.7 KRIO-FM in Roma, Texas. And the 92.7 KESO-FM in Puerto Isabel, Texas. KOIR is owned by Rio Grande Bible Institute, Inc.

References

External links
KOIR's official website

Edinburg, Texas
OIR
OIR